Matheus Izidorio Leoni (born 20 September 1991) is a Brazilian footballer who plays as a defender for NB I club Kisvárda.

References

1991 births
Living people
People from Porto Velho
Brazilian footballers
Brazilian expatriate footballers
Campeonato Brasileiro Série C players
Swiss Challenge League players
First Professional Football League (Bulgaria) players
Nemzeti Bajnokság I players
Salgueiro Atlético Clube players
Guarany Sporting Club players
Caxias Futebol Clube players
Neuchâtel Xamax FCS players
PFC Beroe Stara Zagora players
FC Arda Kardzhali players
Kisvárda FC players
Brazilian expatriate sportspeople in Switzerland
Expatriate footballers in Switzerland
Brazilian expatriate sportspeople in Bulgaria
Expatriate footballers in Bulgaria
Brazilian expatriate sportspeople in Hungary
Expatriate footballers in Hungary
Association football defenders
Sportspeople from Rondônia